Andriy Ivanovych Voynarovsky (1689 - 1740) was a member of the Zaporozhian Army during 1701–1716. He is the nephew and heir of Hetman Ivan Mazepa through his maternal line.

Biography 

Andriy is the son of the nobleman Jan Voynarovsky from his second marriage to Oleksandra Mazepa, the sister of Hetman Ivan Mazepa. He was brought up at the hetman's court of his uncle. He studied at the Kyiv-Mohyla Collegium and the University of Dresden (Saxony). For some time he was at the court of King Augustus II the Strong.

He was captain of the Zaporozhian Army, owner of large estates in Left-bank Ukraine, trustee of the hetman, an active participant in his anti-Moscow actions.

In 1708, with Mazepa and a group of officers, he sided with King Charles XII of Sweden.

After the defeat of the Swedes in the Battle of Poltava in 1709, he emigrated to Bender (Principality of Moldova), and from there to Germany.

He was considered a Cossack senior officer as one of the contenders for the hetman's mace, along with such candidates as Pylyp Orlyk and Kost Hordiyenko. After Mazepa's death and the acquisition of his wealth (which were recognized by Charles XII as private property, not the property of the Zaporozhian Cossacks), Voynarovsky became indifferent to the hetmanship and the government in general. He put private interests above public ones. He was smart, educated, but unpretentious in resolving issues (bribing witnesses and so on).

From 1710 to 1711, together with Philip Orlyk, Voynarovsky encouraged the governments of the Ottoman Empire, the Crimean Khanate and a number of European countries to war with the Moscow Empire, and he tried to form an anti-Moscow coalition of European states.

In 1716, by order of Peter the Great, Voynarovsky was forcibly abducted and taken to the Moscow consul in Hamburg (Germany), after which he was sent to Saint Petersburg, although Voynarovsky was never a citizen of Moscow. He was imprisoned in the Peter and Paul Fortress until 1723. From there he was exiled to Yakutsk, Siberia, Russia where he died in 1740.

In literature 
"Voynarovsky" is a poem by Kondraty Ryleyev.

References

External links 
 Family tree

1689 births
1740 deaths
National University of Kyiv-Mohyla Academy alumni
Ivan Mazepa
People from Bender, Moldova
People from Yakutsk
Russian exiles to Siberia
Prisoners of the Peter and Paul Fortress